Kuwano is a Japanese surname. Notable people with the surname include:

, Japanese violinist, composer and arranger
, Japanese actress
, Japanese television performer

See also 
 6867 Kuwano, a main-belt asteroid
 Kuwano Station, a railway station in Anan, Tokushima Prefecture, Japan

Japanese-language surnames